Empnefsi! is the name of a Greek album by singer Anna Vissi. It was released in Greece and Cyprus in December 1988 by CBS Greece. It featured ten pop songs, written by her then-husband Nikos Karvelas.

Background and release
The lead single Empnefsi ("Inspiration") was met with success, rising to the top of the charts. The song is considered a Greek 80s pop standard. Tracks Houla Houp ("Hula hoop") and Efimerides ("Newspapers") were also aired in the Greek media. 

The album met with commercial success, selling approximately 50,000 copies and reached Gold status.

It was released on CD in early 1989. In the same year, the vinyl LP was released in Spain under the Epic label. In 1997, the CD was re-released for the Greek market as a part of the OK! Budget Price series Sony Music Greece launched at the time.

In 2019, the album was selected for inclusion in the Panik Gold box set The Legendary Recordings 1982-2019. The release came after Panik's acquisition rights of Vissi's back catalogue from her previous record company Sony Music Greece. This box set was printed on a limited edition of 500 copies containing CD releases of all of her albums from 1982 to 2019 plus unreleased material.

Track listing 
All music and lyrics by Nikos Karvelas.
 "Empnefsi" (Inspiration)
 "Amore" (Amore)
 "San Dolofonos Maniakos" (Like a maniac killer)
 "Londino" (London)
 "Den Thelo Na Se Vlepo Sihna" (I don't want to see you frequently)
 "Ohi" (No)
 "Efimerides" (Newspapers)
 "Houla - Houp" (Hula hoop)
 "Oi 9 Stous 10 Horizoune" (9 out of 10 break up)
 "San Mpalaki Tou Tennis" (Like a tennis ball)

Credits and personnel
Credits adapted from the album's liner notes 

Personnel
Stelios Goulielmos - backing vocals
Nikos Karvelas - music, lyrics 
Tony Kontaxakis - guitars
Yiannis Piliouris - backing vocals
Eva Tselidou - backing vocals 
Anna Vissi - vocals 
Lia Vissi - backing vocals

Production
Nikos Karvelas - production management, arrangements, instrumentation, instrument playing
Remy Goux - recording engineering at Studio IN
Studio Sierra - sound remixing

Design
Dinos Diamantopoulos - photos
Thanos Spiropoulos - cover design
Michalis Orfanos - cover printing

References

1988 albums
Anna Vissi albums
Greek-language albums
Sony Music Greece albums